David Ayala (born 26 July 2002) is an Argentine professional footballer who plays as a midfielder for Portland Timbers.

Personal
Ayala's brother, Andrés, is also a professional footballer.

Career statistics

Club

Notes

References

2002 births
Living people
Argentine footballers
Argentine expatriate footballers
Association football midfielders
Argentine Primera División players
Estudiantes de La Plata footballers
Portland Timbers players
Portland Timbers 2 players
Argentine expatriate sportspeople in the United States
Expatriate soccer players in the United States
Major League Soccer players
People from Berazategui Partido
Sportspeople from Buenos Aires Province
MLS Next Pro players